The Economic Freedom Fighters (EFF) is a South African left-wing to far-left pan-Africanist and Marxist–Leninist political party. It was founded by expelled former African National Congress Youth League (ANCYL) President Julius Malema, and his allies, in 2013. Malema is President of the EFF, heading the Central Command Team which serves as the central structure of the party. It is currently the third-largest party in both houses of the South African Parliament.

History

Foundation 
At a 26 July 2013 press briefing in Soweto, Malema announced that the new party had over 1000 members, double the 500 required for registration with the Independent Electoral Commission (IEC). The EFF is now registered with the IEC, after an objection to its registration by the Freedom Front Plus (FF+) was dismissed in September 2013.

Splinters and infighting 
In 2015, the EFF suspended MP Lucky Twala and expelled three MPs, Mpho Ramakatsa, Andile Mngxitama and Khanyisile Litchfield-Tshabalala. Mngxitama formed his own party, named Black First Land First (BLF), while Litchfield-Tshabalala joined the United Democratic Movement. Malema has been chiefly accused by former members of purging his critics to consolidate his power, thus ruling the party with an iron fist. Malema acknowledged this criticism in a press conference and further went on to say, the party should have expelled more ill-disciplined members.

Actions 
On 6 August 2015, the EFF announced that it has secured a Constitutional Court case for its "#PayBackTheMoney" campaign against Jacob Zuma. The case was heard on 9 February 2016. The judgement was released by Chief Justice Mogoeng Mogoeng and stated that the then-President had violated the Constitution of South Africa, along with the Speaker of the National Assembly Baleka Mbete. The President was given 60 days to fulfill the requirements of the Public Protector Thuli Madonsela.

On 27 February 2018, the EFF tabled a motion in the National Assembly to amend the Constitution so as to allow for the expropriation of land without compensation. The motion, brought by the EFF leader Julius Malema, was adopted with a vote of 241 in support, and 83 against. The only parties who did not support the motion were the Democratic Alliance, Freedom Front Plus, COPE and the ACDP. Land expropriation is one of the EFF's seven cardinal pillars.

In 2018, the party's student wing, the EFF Student Command won many universities across the country. The red berets defeated the ANC-aligned South African Students Congress (SASCO) at the Durban University of Technology, the University of Zululand and Mangosuthu University of Technology. They also won in Cape Town, the District Six, Mowbray and Bellville Cape Peninsula University of Technology (CPUT) campuses with landslide victories, meaning they now are in charge of the institution's SRC. They also won the University of Cape Town. Peter Keetse, president of the EFFSC, said the win was a warning shot for what was going to happen in 2019 national general elections. He said the youth were the influencers of the future, "therefore, this is an indication of what is to follow".

Ideology and policies 
In 2016, after local elections in South Africa, the EFF has suggested that they will back the Democratic Alliance in hung-metro areas, but would not be entering into a coalition with any political party in South Africa.

The EFF was the only parliamentary party that opposed the 2018 political party funding bill; a funding transparency law that requires political parties to publish who they receive funding from.

Ideology 
The EFF "draws inspiration from the broad Marxist–Leninist tradition and Fanonian schools of thought in their analyses of the state, imperialism, culture and class contradictions in every society", according to its constitution. The EFF states that it takes inspiration from Burkinabe President Thomas Sankara in terms of both style and Marxist ideology. Prominent EFF member Jackie Shandu declared the party a "proudly Sankarist formation".

Economics 
It criticises the African National Congress and their primary opposition, the Democratic Alliance, for their allegedly pro-business stances, which it claims have sold out the black people of South Africa to capitalism as cheap labour. It promises to tackle corruption, provide quality social housing, and provide free primary healthcare and education for all, as well as proposing to expropriate White-owned farmland, nationalise the mining and banking sectors, double welfare grants and the minimum wage, and end the proposed toll system for highways.

The EFF has been vocal in its criticism of black business owners and black owners of mining companies in South Africa. In an address at the Oxford Union in November 2015, Malema spoke out against billionaire mining company owner Patrice Motsepe. Further protests in 2015, the EFF delivered demands that included the socialisation of the mining sector and called for more explicit targets for the 26% BEE ownership required by law.  The EFF is a vocal proponent of expanding the role of South African state-owned enterprises in the national economy. Malema addressed a crowd in Marikana, Rustenburg in the platinum mining area, blaming mining companies and calling out platinum mining company Lonmin in particular, for poverty in the region.

Foreign policy 
The EFF presents itself as a Pan-Africanist party and supports the proposal for a United States of Africa. In respect to this, the EFF and Malema have repeatedly praised former Libyan leader Muammar Gaddafi, promising to implement many of the policies in South Africa that Gaddafi implemented in Libya. The party is against presence of the American military bases in Africa, most notably in Botswana. Prior to forming the EFF Malema had called for the overthrow of Khama's government in Botswana. The EFF is critical of France's presence in Africa; in 2022 the party picketed outside of and ultimately barricaded the country's embassy in Pretoria. The French ambassador to South Africa criticised the EFF for scapegoating France as the supposed source of all Africa's problems. The EFF is against Zionism.

The EFF officially supports Russia's 2022 invasion of Ukraine, commending what they refer to as Russia's "anti-imperialist programme" against NATO. The party is strongly critical of Israel and its conflict with the Palestinians; referring to the country as "evil" and advocating for its destruction. In September 2022 the EFF announced that they would not mourn the death of Queen Elizabeth as "she never once acknowledged the atrocities her family inflicted on native people that Britain invaded across the world." The EFF also supports closer relations with China and considers Taiwan to be an "integral part" of the People's Republic of China, and has called the Chinese Communist Party the "torch-bearer for all Marxist–Leninist formations in the world".

Support base and prominent members
According to a November 2013 Ipsos survey, the party's supporters are younger than average, with 49% being younger than 24, overwhelmingly black (99%) and mostly male, with women representing only 33% of the support base. A disproportionate number of supporters live in Malema's home province of Limpopo (28%), while only 1% live in KwaZulu-Natal, a more populous province. A 2018 survey conducted by social research company Citizen Surveys found that around 70% of EFF supporters were between the ages of 18 to 34, overwhelmingly black (97%), mostly based in major metropolitan cities (48%), predominantly male (62%) with 43% of their support base located in Gauteng Province. The party was expected to make an impact in the 2014 general election, taking between 4 per cent and 8 per cent of the national vote. This was potentially enough for the party to hold the balance of power in provinces where the governing African National Congress was in danger of losing its absolute majority. The ANC retained its absolute majority whilst the EFF got 6.35% of the vote in the 2014 election.

High-profile members of the Central Command Team include Floyd Shivambu, Fana Mokoena and Mbuyiseni Ndlozi (National Spokesperson). Controversial businessman Kenny Kunene joined the Central Command Team in July 2013 before resigning from the Central Command Team on 20 August 2013 and from the organisation on 26 August 2013. On 4 November 2013, it was announced that Dali Mpofu had left the African National Congress (ANC) after 33 years of membership and joined the EFF.

Student wing 
The EFF Students Command (EFFSC) is the party's student wing, founded on 16 June 2015. It campaigns for free education, universal access to education and the elimination of registration fees, among other things. The EFF Students Command claims a membership of about 100,000 students and has branches across all the nine provinces of South Africa. Its current president is Sihle Lonzi.

Criticisms and controversies

Foreign ties and legal issues
The ANC has accused the Zimbabwean ruling party, the Zimbabwe African National Union – Patriotic Front (ZANU–PF), of supporting the EFF in order to destabilise the ANC.

The EFF was found guilty of defamation of character in May 2019, by the South Gauteng High Court and ordered to pay R500,000 in damages to former Finance Minister Trevor Manuel. Manuel brought the EFF and its leader, Julius Malema, to court after they alleged that the appointment of Edward Kieswetter as commissioner of SARS by Manuel was the result of nepotism.  Following the judgement Manuel stated that he would be donating the R500,000 in damages to victims of the VBS Mutual Bank scandal which the EFF is alleged to have participated in.

Following a string of court case losses for inciting supporters to commit acts of either intimidation (against journalist Karima Brown), land invasion (which case was brought by AfriForum) or of defamation of character (against ANC politician Trevor Manuel) the party was left with combined court costs amounting to almost R1 million.

Corruption

Tenders 
A number of articles published by investigative journalists have accused the party of using their influence to earn improper payments from government suppliers in cities where the EFF has significant representative power. An investigation by the amaBhungane centre for investigative journalism stated that the EFF received R500,000 in kickbacks from a company in return for a R1.26 billion contract to manage a fleet of vehicles used by the City of Johannesburg with tacit acquiescence of the Democratic Alliance. Another investigation alleges that the party improperly benefited from the awarding of a fuel supply contract for the City of Tshwane netting the party R15 million from successful contractors.

VBS Mutual Bank 

Following the publication of a South African Reserve Bank report into the collapse of VBS Mutual Bank implicating EFF deputy president Floyd Shivambu's brother media reports came out alleging that Shivambu received R10 million in illicit payments from VBS prior to it being placed under curatorship in March 2018. Prior to the publication of the Reserve Bank's report the EFF criticised the Reserve Bank for placing VBS under curatorship and accused it of victimising VBS on racial grounds. The EFF stated that it had seen no evidence that Shivambu received the R10 million and called for government to recapitalise VBS Mutual Bank whilst also taking legal action against those mentioned in the Reserve Bank report. A follow up investigation by the Daily Maverick alleged that the EFF illicitly received R1.8 million of VBS money through a network of proxy companies with the party's leadership (notably Shivambu and Malema) also illicitly receiving money though this network. After being approached by the Mail & Guardian for comment on his personal financial expenses Floyd Shivambu admitted that money from VBS, channeled through his brother, was used to buy his Range Rover Sport valued at R680,000. By June 2021 Shivambu's brother had repaid R4.55 million and admitted to taking VBS money.

A follow up investigation by the Daily Maverick found that R454,000 of VBS money was used to pay for the 2017 EFF birthday celebration. It also found that a total of R16.1 million was channeled through a Shivambu associated company largely for the benefit of the EFF. An additional investigation traced financial statements from an account that received VBS funds and allegedly controlled by Julius Malema; leading the author of the investigation to estimate that Malema received and directly benefited from R5.3-million illegally taken from VBS. Additional media reports in October 2019, alleged that the party received R4 million of VBS funds into a slush fund that was channeled to Malema via a company named Santaclara Trading.

A former member of the EFF's leadership accused the party leadership of accepting donations from VBS Mutual Bank prior to its collapse.

Malema later forwarded a conspiracy theory that the VBS collapse was part of a plot intended to damage the EFF.

Violence 
Feminists have characterised leading members of the party as misogynist. In October 2018, a group of 17 former EFF members and councillors in the Northern Cape accused the party's senior leadership of corruption and sexual exploitation of more junior female party members.  Four months later two former female employees of the EFF claimed that party leadership intimidated and engaged in acts of bullying behaviour towards them and other party staff members.

Following the temporary removal of 8 EFF provincial MPs from Gauteng Provincial Legislature a large number of EFF members protesting against the ruling stormed the provincial legislature building.

During violent university protests characterised by arson and vandalism, EFF Youth leader Omphile Seleke posted instructions for making petrol bombs on social media.

EFF Deputy President Floyd Shivambu congratulated the party supporters for causing damage to various H&M stores across South Africa due to a picture of a young black child wearing a green hoodie reading, "Coolest Monkey in the Jungle". A Vodacom store in Polokwane was damaged and looted by EFF members following a presentation by Corruption Watch at the 2018 Vodacom Awards which included an image depicting EFF leaders Malema and Shivambu as "abusers of Democracy".

Following the 2019 State of the Nation address in parliament by President Ramaphosa, EFF MP Marshall Dlamini physically assaulted a member of the presidential security team after a disagreement between EFF MPs and the security.

During a October 2022 speech to members of the Western Cape EFF branch Malema stated the party members should "never be scared to kill" in pursuit of what Malema described as the party's revolution. The South African Human Rights Commission (SAHRC) ruled that the statement along with seven other statements made by the EFF, such as “a revolutionary must become a cold killing machine motivated by pure hate,” constituted hate speech. The EFF disputed the SAHRC's ruling.

Intimidation of journalists and the media 
Journalist Ranjeni Munusamy lodged an affidavit in December 2018 detailing threatening remarks, intimidation, harassment and personal attacks made by party members, including Malema, towards her and other journalists targeted by the party. The affidavit was supported by the South African National Editors Forum and other notable South African journalists such as Max du Preez, Pauli VanWyk, Adriaan Jurgens Basson, and Barry Bateman. The EFF denied any involvement in attacks on Munusamy and other journalists.
South African political journalist Karima Brown was the target of verbal abuse and threats of violence by EFF supporters following the EFF's publication of her personal contact details. This led charges with the police and Equity Court being laid against the party amidst speculation that this instance might be in breach of South Africa's Electoral Code of Conduct. Parties in breach of the code risk having their registration to run in elections being revoked. Malema stated on the incident that journalists have no privileges whilst accusing Brown of being a state agent and denied that EFF supporters were making threatening remarks. The court found in favour of Brown and ruled that the EFF had contravened the South African electoral code by inciting its supporters to harass Brown.

Following the publication of an article by the amaBhungane Centre for investigative journalism looking into allegations of corruption by the EFF the party controversially announced that it would be banning both amaBhungane and the Daily Maverick from its public events and announced that they would be treated an enemies of the party.

In January 2020 the EFF was forced to publicly apologies and pay damages following a Gauteng High Court judgment that the party had made and spread false allegations that two journalists, Thandeka Gqubule and Anton Harber, were apartheid era 'StratCom' agents.

Racial and ethnic prejudice 
Since its establishment the EFF has made a number of controversial racially or ethnically based statements about a number of South African minority groups. The EFF has been widely criticised for inciting and perpetuating racism. The EFF's has been criticized for adopting a biological interpretation of race that allows the party to easily generalise and attribute racism to particular groups or individuals based on their demographic classification; who in turn are targeted for racial prejudiced by the party. This has had a polarizing and radicalizing impact on South African politics. Leaders of the party have targeted a number of public servants, journalists and communities based on their race.

Anti-black racism 
Anthony Mathumba, an EFF councillor of the Makhado Local Municipality, is currently in court for hate speech. In June 2020, he is alleged to have created a Twitter account where he pretended to be a white woman and made racist comments to black women.

Anti-Indian racism 
The South African Minority Rights Equality Movement initiated a court case against Malema for inciting racial sentiment by stating that a "majority of Indians are racist" at an EFF Youth Day rally in 2018.

The EFF was criticised by the South African Council of Churches, the Ahmed Kathrada Foundation, and the ANC for comparing Public Enterprises Minister Pravin Gordhan to a "dog" whilst protesting against the Zondo Commission inquiry into government corruption. The EFF also accused the anti-corruption investigators of being members of an "Indian cabal" commenting on the presence of Indian South African's making up the investigative team. The EFF also retaliated against Gordhan by accusing him and his daughter of corruption. The EFF accusations were proven false and Gordhan laid charge of defamation against Malema stating that the EFF's "determined defence of corruption and the corrupt, using personal attacks, racism and alleged hate speech is not acceptable and must be challenged."  The Equality Court declared that the EFF was not guilty of hate speech in its statements relating to Gordhan. EFF leadership and its supporters have been criticised for using Gordhan's second name, Jamnadas, as a racial dog whistle to highlight to his Indian ethnicity in a pejorative way and question his status as a South African on social media.

ANC member and government minister, the late Jackson Mthembu, accused the EFF of being racist and having a "deep-seated hatred" for Indian South Africans whilst criticizing the party's pursuit of Gordhan during a parliamentary debate.

Anti-white racism 
During a 2016 political rally, EFF leader Julius Malema stated, "We are not calling for the slaughter of white people, at least for now." When asked for comment by a news agency, the ANC spokesperson, Zizi Kodwa stated that there will be no comment from the ANC, as "[Malema] was addressing his own party supporters." While still the ANCYL leader, Malema was taken to the Equality Court by AfriForum for repeatedly singing "dubul' ibhunu", meaning "shoot the boer [white farmer]". The ANC supported Malema, though AfriForum and the ANC reached a settlement before the appeal case was due to be argued in the Supreme Court of Appeal. A later 2022 hate speech case brought against Malema by AfriForum for singing the same song found that the song was not hate speech.

South Africa's Independent Electoral Commission disqualified EFF councillor Thabo Mabotja from the 2016 local elections due to a tweet by Mabotja calling for the hacking and killing of white South Africans. The EFF formally welcomed the commission's decision and renounced Mabotja.

Speaking at a political rally in 2018, Malema told supporters to "go after a white man", a reference to Nelson Mandela Bay mayor Athol Trollip, adding that "we are cutting the throat of whiteness". This led to the Democratic Alliance accusing the EFF's leader, Malema, of racism and not sharing the more tolerant views of South Africans broadly. The EFF later stated that the reference to the "throat of whiteness" was "a metaphorical reference to destroying white privilege" and was "not referring or advocating harm to white people".

Following the death of former Zimbabwean President Robert Mugabe, Malema tweeted a number of controversial quotes from the late Mugabe that were malicious towards white people, most notably "The only white man you can trust is a dead white man".  The SAHRC condemned the quote and stated that they would be taking Malema to court for spreading hate speech.

Ideological criticisms
Feminists and the National Union of Metalworkers of South Africa have criticised the party's militarism and "military command structure". In April 2019, a former member of the EFF's central command, Thembinkosi Rawula, accused senior party leaders of dictatorial leadership practices. The EFF denied Rawula's accusation and stated that they would sue him for defamation as well as make the party's financials public.  Despite sharing similar ideological roots, the South African Communist Party also condemned the party.

Allegations of fascism 
Party practices in addition to its legacy of racial prejudice have been widely defined as "fascist"; with its leader Julius Malema, and the party's cult of personality surrounding him, compared to Benito Mussolini. South African academic Vishwas Satgar argues that the EFF is not comparable to fascist parties of the twentieth century but that it is instead a black neofacist party based on the ideologies of centralised state ownership and control, African nativism and "revenge politics"; and that its appeals to "race baiting, nativist nationalism, hypermasculinity, and disposition to violence are similar in these respects to the new fascisms rising in Europe, the United States, and India."

In mid-June 2016, a group calling themselves "Anonymous Africa", claiming to be associated with the hacktivist group Anonymous, condemned the party and perpetrated a DDoS attack on the EFF's website stating the reason for the attack was the party's "nationalist socialist rhetoric".

Election results

National elections

National Assembly 

|-
!Election
!Total votes
!Share of vote
!Seats 
!+/–
!Government
|-
!2014
|1,169,259
|6.35%
|
| 25
|
|-
!2019
|1,881,521
|10.79%
|
| 19
|
|}

National Council of Provinces 

|-
!Election
!Total # ofseats won
!+/–
|-
!2014
|
| 7
|-
!2019
|
| 4
|}

Provincial elections 

!rowspan=2|Election
!colspan=2|Eastern Cape
!colspan=2|Free State
!colspan=2|Gauteng
!colspan=2|Kwazulu-Natal
!colspan=2|Limpopo
!colspan=2|Mpumalanga
!colspan=2|North-West
!colspan=2|Northern Cape
!colspan=2|Western Cape
|- 
!%!!Seats
!%!!Seats
!%!!Seats
!%!!Seats
!%!!Seats
!%!!Seats
!%!!Seats
!%!!Seats
!%!!Seats
|-
!2014
|3.48%||2/63
|8.15%||2/30
|10.30%||8/73
|1.85%||2/80
|10.74%||6/49
|6.26%||2/30
|13.21%||5/33
|4.96%||2/30
|2.11%||1/42
|-
!2019
|7.84%||5/63
|12.58%||4/30
|14.69%||11/73
|9.71%||8/80
|14.43%||7/49
|12.79%||4/30
|18.36%||6/33
|9.71%||3/30
|4.04%||2/42
|}

Municipal elections 

|-
!Election
!Votes
!%
|-
!2016
|3,202,679
|8.31%
|-
!2021
|3,223,828
|10.54%
|}

See also 
 Namibian Economic Freedom Fighters
 Socialist Party of Azania
 Workers and Socialist Party

References

Further reading 
 
 
 Julius Malema (preface), EFF 2014 Elections Manifesto, Economic Freedom Fighters.

External links 
 
 Old official website

 
African and Black nationalist organizations in Africa
Anti-capitalist political parties
Left-wing politics in South Africa
Far-left political parties
Racism in South Africa
Political parties in South Africa
Organizations established in 2013
National liberation movements in Africa
Communist parties in South Africa
Left-wing nationalist parties
Pan-Africanist political parties in Africa
Left-wing parties
2013 establishments in South Africa
Anti-imperialist organizations
African and Black nationalism in South Africa
Marxism–Leninism
Nationalist parties in South Africa
Political parties based in Johannesburg
Pan-Africanism in South Africa
Political parties established in 2013
Sankarist political parties
Anti-Zionism in Africa
Antisemitism in Africa
Anti-Indian racism in Africa
Anti-white racism in Africa